Henry Austin Scudder (November 25, 1819 – January 26, 1892), was a Massachusetts state legislator.

Scudder, youngest son of Josiah and Hannah (Lovell) Scudder, was born in Barnstable, Massachusetts, on November 25, 1819.  He entered Yale College with the Class of 1841, but withdrew after a single term, and for the next year edited the Barnstable Patriot.  After graduating he studied law in the office of his brother, the Hon. Zeno Scudder, in Barnstable, until the spring of 1844.  After six months of further study in the office of the Hon. George T. Bigelow, of Boston, he began the practice of his profession there. On June 30, 1857, he married Nannie B. Jackson, of Boston, daughter of Captain Charles B. Tobey, of Nantucket, Mass. In 1863–65 he was a member of the Massachusetts Legislature from Dorchester. In February, 1869, he was appointed one of the Associate Judges of the Superior Court of Massachusetts, which office he was compelled to resign in 1872, because of ill-health. He then went to Europe, and returned in 1874, partially restored. For the rest of his life, the winters were passed in Washington, D. C, and the summers at Marston's Mills, in his native town. He died suddenly from apoplexy, in Washington, on January 26, 1892, in his 73rd year. His wife survived him without children.

References

External links
 

1819 births
1892 deaths
Members of the Massachusetts General Court
People from Marstons Mills, Massachusetts
Massachusetts lawyers
Yale College alumni
19th-century American politicians
19th-century American lawyers